Abdelhafidh Yaha was a revolutionary fighter and guerrilla leader of the National Liberation Front who fought for Algerian independence against the French occupation.

In 1954 he joined the Front de libération nationale with the liberation of his brother.

In the days that followed, the exactions redoubled ferocity: arrests, tortures and destruction.

References 

1933 births
2016 deaths
Members of the National Liberation Front (Algeria)
Algerian revolutionaries
Algerian independence activists
21st-century Algerian people